The iron law of prohibition is a term coined by Richard Cowan in 1986 which posits that as law enforcement becomes more intense, the potency of prohibited substances increases. Cowan put it this way: "the harder the enforcement, the harder the drugs."

This law is an application of the Alchian–Allen effect; Libertarian judge
Jim Gray calls the law the "cardinal rule of prohibition", and notes that is a powerful argument for the legalization of drugs. It is based on the premise that when drugs or alcohol are prohibited, they will be produced in black markets in more concentrated and powerful forms, because these more potent forms offer better efficiency in the business model—they take up less space in storage, less weight in transportation, and they sell for more money. Economist Mark Thornton writes that the iron law of prohibition undermines the argument in favor of prohibition, because the higher potency forms are less safe for the consumer.

Findings

Thornton published research showing that the potency of marijuana increased in response to higher enforcement budgets. He later expanded this research in his dissertation to include other illegal drugs and alcohol during Prohibition in the United States (1920–1933). The basic approach is based on the Alchian and Allen Theorem. This argument says that a fixed cost (e.g. transportation fee) added to the price of two varieties of the same product (e.g. high quality red apple and a low quality red apple) results in greater sales of the more expensive variety. When applied to rum-running, drug smuggling, and blockade running the more potent products become the sole focus of the suppliers. Thornton notes that the greatest added cost in illegal sales is the avoidance of detection. Thornton says that if drugs are legalized, then consumers will begin to wean themselves off the higher potency forms, for instance with cocaine users buying coca leaves, and heroin users switching to opium.

The popular shift from beer to wine to hard liquor during the US Prohibition era has a parallel in the narcotics trade in the late 20th century. Bulky opium was illegal, so refined heroin became more prevalent, albeit with significant risk from blood-borne disease because of injection by needle, and far greater risk of death from overdose. Marijuana was also found too bulky and troublesome to smuggle across borders, so smugglers turned to refined cocaine with its much higher potency and profit per pound. Cowan wrote in 1986 that crack cocaine was entirely a product of the prohibition of drugs. Clinical psychiatrist Michael J. Reznicek adds crystal meth to this list. In the 2010s the iron law has been invoked to explain why heroin is displaced by fentanyl and other, even stronger, synthetic opioids.

With underage drinking by teens in the U.S., one of the impacts of laws against possession of alcohol by minors is that teens tend to prefer distilled spirits, because they are easier to conceal than beer.

Derivation 
Each of these goods has a compensated demand curve (a demand curve which holds utility constant) of the form
 
where

with  denoting the utility function of the consumer. Furthermore, we will also assume that income is held constant, as income effects are indeterminate in forecasting changes in demand.

Therefore, we may compute  to be 

We may now rewrite as 

Finally, using the cross-elasticity of demand, 

we arrive at the following expression of the derivative

For a homogeneous function  of degree , defined as

Euler's homogeneous function theorem states that

Compensated demand functions are homogeneous of degree 0, since multiplying all prices by a constant  yields the same solution to the expenditure minimization problem as the original prices. Thus,

Dividing by the stock  yields

which establishes Hicks' third law of demand.

Using Hicks' law, is rewritten as

Suppose for the sake of contradiction that . Then,

By initial assumption, our two goods are substitutes.

But, this contradicts the assumption that . Thus, we conclude that . This implies that as the transport costs increase, the higher quality good will become more prevalent than the lower quality good. In the drug-specific context, as costs associated with drug enforcement increase, the more potent drug will become more prevalent in the illegal drug market.

References

Further reading 

 
 
 
 
 

Economics laws
Prohibition
1986 in economics
Drug control law
Smuggling
Law and economics
Mathematical economics